Fredrick Redd is an operatic baritone and businessman. He is the Vice President of PACO Group, the President and Owner of Fredrick Redd Consulting LLC, and the Managing Partner of Aldebaran Solutions.

Redd has performed in concert, opera, musical theatre, recitals, radio, television and film. As a lead baritone singer, he has performed with the New York City Opera, Opera North, Opera Carolina, Connecticut Grand Opera, Teatro Grattacielo, New York Grand Opera, Harrisburg Opera, Verismo Opera, Piedmont Opera, and Houston Opera Ebony, among others. 

Redd served in a tenure track position as Assistant Professor of Construction Management from 1996-1999 at Utica College of Syracuse University (now Utica University). He served as an Adjunct Faculty member at the New York University' School of Continuing Education from 1993-1996 and at the University of Phoenix from 2014-2015.

Redd is also an active athlete and has completed over 20 triathlons, 4 marathons and become an Ironman finisher in 2017 and 2018. In 2012, Fredrick completed the 1.5 mile Sharkfest swim from Alcatraz to the shore in San Francisco.

Early life and education
Redd was born in Beaumont Texas, and 6 months later he moved with his family to Houston, Texas. He studied piano and trombone while attending the High School for Engineering Professions in Houston Texas. After graduating from high school, Redd went on to complete his Bachelor’s degree in Civil Engineering from the University of Texas at Austin. Redd continued his musical studies at the Juilliard School and in Italy at the Accademia Chigiana and the Spoleto Vocal Institute. He then returned to the United States, and worked on his graduate Architecture coursework at Syracuse University. Redd decided not complete is Master’s degree in Architecture and ultimately completed  Master of Business Administration (MBA) from Rochester Institute of Technology.

Career
Redd started his engineering career in Austin Texas and he moved to Princeton, NJ to continue his engineering career. While there, he joined the chorus with Princeton Pro Musica that led him to start voice lessons. Moving to New York City, to continue vocal studies at the Juilliard School’s he met Vincent La Selva, conductor of New York Grand Opera who became his mentor and started his professional singing career in opera. In 2002, he made his New York City Opera debut in Lincoln as the Undertaker in Porgy & Bess as a part of the PBS Great Performances Series. One year later, he made his Carnegie Hall mainstage debut as the baritone soloist in Carmina Burana with the New England Symphonic Ensemble in a Mid America Production. In 2005, Fredrick returned to Carnegie Hall with New York Grand Opera to perform Giacomo in Verdi’s Giovanna D’Arco and again in 2006 as the baritone soloist in Beethoven’s Ninth Symphony.

In 2003, Redd became Founder and CEO of Project Management Resource Group. Between 2009 and 2013, he served as Director of Project Management Office (PMO) at Port Authority of NY & NJ. He held appointment as a CEO and President for Assai Management Consulting in 2013. In 2019, he became the Principal of North Highland Worldwide Consulting where his work as an African-American in the arts was supported.He made Merkin Hall recital debut in 2012.

In 2019, Redd returned to Carnegie Hall as a soloist in Mark Hayes’ Te Deum In 2019, Redd returned to New York City Opera as featured artist in world premiere of Stonewall. In 2021, He portrayed the character of James in world premiere of Martinsville 7 with Trilogy Opera in August 2021.

In 2022, Redd performed his first Wagner role as Wotan in Das Rheingold  and debuted as Hark in the opera Nat Turner by Michael Raphael with the New Jersey Symphony. Redd returned to Carnegie Hall main stage performances on May 27th, 28th and June 30 as soloist in Haydn's Creation, Mozart's Regina Coeli, and Hayes' Requiem. As invited, Redd sang in the 45th Annual Benefit Concert for the William Warfield Scholarship Fund and collaborated with Harold Danko, international jazz pianist and recording artist in singing "Ole Man River" one of Warfield's signature songs. In October 22, Fred starred as Dom Claude Frollo in the Hunchback of Notre Dame (Equity Off-Broadway) and performed excerpts as the title role in Rigoletto for the Metropolitan Opera Guild and their program series on The Verdi Baritone.  In this series, Fredrick also covered the roles of Germont (La Traviata), Rodrigo (Don Carlo) and Amonasro (Aida). And finally rounding out the year leading Masterclasses for vocal students at the Rochester Institute of Technology (RIT) School of Performing Arts in Rochester. This fall, Mr. Redd joined RIT's Advisory Board and also joined President David C. Munson's Roundtable of advisors.

Reception
Redd’s concert work includes performances of over 20 classical oratorio works with orchestras. His television and film credits include Great Performances: Live from Lincoln Center: and New York City Opera’s production of Porgy and Bess.

His most recent review in 2022, as the menacing Dom Frollo in the Hunchback of Notre Dame, Leslie Sattler wrote:"While Fredrick Redd is very plainly a singer first and an actor second, he is a fine Frollo. His first act’s solo was the highlight of my viewing experience."  

Redd performed as Baron Scarpia in "Tre sbirri una carozza" in Puccini's Tosca. Ray Harris praised his performance while stating "And what a consummate villain Scarpia was as sung by baritone Fredrick Redd! How he made you hate the character he played!" J. Noble, Jr. is of the view that "The villainous Scarpia was sung by baritone Fredrick Redd, whose full-bodied sound completed the triumvirate of principal vocal power."

In 2000, Redd starred in the titular role in Emperor Jones Opera by Louis Gruenberg. His performance received positive reviews with Eugene O'Neil writing that "Director Patrick Casey was fortunate in his choice of Fredrick Redd as the central figure." Opera Now wrote that "Fredrick Redd was a powerful Jones, metamorphosing from a strutting Idi Amin type to a disintegrating wreck. The parlando vocal writing didn't give him much of a chance to soar, but he was a compelling vocal actor."

Redd starred as Renato in Un Ballo in Maschera performed in 2006. The Italian Voice reviewed his performance writing "Renato (Riccardo's secretary and murderer), was masterfully sung by Fredrick Redd.  His strong yet mellow baritone negotiated the dramatic, vengeful and poignant passages of Verdi with many memorable moments, among them his soulful singing of "Eri tu", towards the end of Act 2. Redd's voice challenged to the limit by this aria and he met the challenge by making us feel Renato's heartbreak earning him an ovation as well."

Awards and honors
2014 - 20 Most Promising Construction Consultants in 2014, CIO Review Magazine
2016 - 50 Most Admired Companies to Watch, Silicone Review

Selected publications/discography
Estimating for Building Construction (1999)
Film credit - Porgy & Bess
CD credit - Contemporary Chamber Art-Fink: CD 0685 (BAR 0 89658 06852 5)Morning Sky RUSSO, Three Songs for baritone, clarinet, cello & piano My Star, Nightingails, The First Day sung by Fredrick Redd, baritone/John Russo, clarinet/Stephen Framil, cello/Mary Jo Pena.

References 

American baritones
American operatic baritones
Syracuse University alumni
University of Texas at Austin alumni
Rochester Institute of Technology alumni
Living people
Year of birth missing (living people)